Juan Andres Guzmán Correa (born October 28, 1966) is a former pitcher in Major League Baseball. Guzman spent most of his playing career with the Toronto Blue Jays and was part of their World Series winning teams in 1992 and 1993.

Career
Guzmán was originally signed by the Los Angeles Dodgers as an amateur free agent in 1985. He pitched for the Blue Jays from 1991 to 1998, then played briefly for the Baltimore Orioles, Cincinnati Reds, and Tampa Bay Devil Rays, finishing with a career ERA of 4.08.

In his first three seasons with the Blue Jays, he went a combined 40–11 with a 3.28 ERA. The Jays made the playoffs all three years, winning the World Series in 1992 and 1993. Guzman won two games in both the 1992 and 1993 ALCS, but did not secure a win in either World Series. His playoff record was 5–1 in eight starts, with a 2.44 ERA.

Guzman had an ERA of 2.93 in 1996, the lowest in the American League among qualified pitchers. Guzman had a very good fastball, striking out 7.5 batters per nine innings during his career. He led the American league in wild pitches in 1993 and 1994.

On July 31, 1999, Guzmán and cash were traded to the Reds for B. J. Ryan and Jacobo Sequea.

See also
 List of Major League Baseball annual ERA leaders

References

External links

1966 births
American League All-Stars
American League ERA champions
Baltimore Orioles players
Bakersfield Dodgers players
Cincinnati Reds players
Dominican Republic expatriate baseball players in Canada
Dominican Republic expatriate baseball players in the United States
Dunedin Blue Jays players
Durham Bulls players
Gulf Coast Dodgers players
Knoxville Blue Jays players
Knoxville Smokies players

Living people
Major League Baseball pitchers
Major League Baseball players from the Dominican Republic
Orlando Rays players
St. Petersburg Devil Rays players
Syracuse Chiefs players
Toronto Blue Jays players
Tampa Bay Devil Rays players
Vero Beach Dodgers players